OJG Klal Israël (. English: OPEN Jewish Congregation Klal Israel) was founded in 2005, in Delft, the Netherlands. OJG Klal Israel holds services twice a month in the Delft synagogue, Koornmarkt 12 in Delft. It is affiliated with the Jewish Reconstructionist Communities.

Position within Judaism

OJG Klal Israël is part of Progressive Judaism, and holds progressive views on, among many issues, homosexuality, the role of women and the role of non-Jewish family members in the congregation. Its essential moral foundations are: equity and justice, equality, democracy and peace. The congregation defines itself as independent and "reformodox".  It largely follows the Dutch liberal liturgy. It views Torah as a binding blueprint for a meaningful Jewish life. However, in accordance with the talmudic injunction not to accept jurisprudence unquestioningly, it maintains that the interpretation of the law must be shaped by a dynamic and critical process that takes into account the needs and peculiarities of the modern world, and of the evolving Jewish civilization.

Rabbi

Starting Rosh HaShana 5777 (October 2nd, 2016) Hannah Nathans is rabbi of OJG Klal Israël.

References

External links

 Congregation Klal Israël 
 Jewish Reconstructionist Communities 

Synagogues in the Netherlands
Jewish Dutch history
Buildings and structures in Delft
Reconstructionist synagogues